Ralph Santolla (December 8, 1966 – June 7, 2018) was an Italian-American heavy metal guitarist. He played in many bands, most recently Deicide, but also including Eyewitness, Death (he never recorded any of their albums, but toured with them in 1993 and appeared in "The Philosopher" video), Millenium, Iced Earth, and the Sebastian Bach band. In 2007, he replaced Allen West in Obituary for their album Xecutioner's Return. Santolla was very proud of his Italian heritage and he played guitars by Jackson and Ibanez with the Italian flag painted on them. He most recently played Jackson Guitars, though he had also been associated with ESP Guitars, Dean Guitars and many others. He also used Randall Amplifiers. He was well known for his shred guitar playing style.

Biography 

Born on December 8, 1966, Santolla was a practicing Roman Catholic, which has caused controversy with Deicide fans, many of whom are against Christianity and are aware of frontman Glen Benton's open Satanism. Many were surprised that Benton even let Santolla join the band, due to his frequent criticism of the religion. However, Santolla stated that he was "not going to pretend to be some dark and evil person just so people think I'm metal," and also stated that he respected Benton, despite differences in their religion and beliefs, for not being afraid to be true to himself.

At a 2006 Deicide gig in Laredo, Texas that got out of control, Santolla was arrested for allegedly throwing a Red Bull can at an officer after Deicide was forced to stop playing.

He had frequently talked about starting his own band with Steve DiGiorgio and Gene Hoglan, both of whom he worked with in Death. Before his death he was working on a new solo instrumental album, titled Requiem for Hope. This is his second solo album, his first was Shaolin Monks in the Temple of Metal.  On May 24, 2007, Santolla left Deicide for undisclosed reasons.

Also in 2007, Santolla was called in to fill the spot on Obituary's album Xecutioner's Return and the subsequent Left To Die EP, replacing Allen West after he was incarcerated until 2008. In 2010 he rejoined Deicide. In 2011, he departed Deicide.

He played guitar on Deathembers debut album Going Postal track 9 Hailing Down.

In 2013 Santolla became member of thrash metal band Toxik.

Santolla's last recording would be released right before his death. He played guest guitar on the song "From Neptune Towards Assyria" for the band Order ov Riven Cathedrals from Rome, Italy on their 2018 release "Göbekli Tepe" and on the song "They Will Listen To The Dead" for the band BlightMass from Lyon/Tampa on their 2019 release "Severed From Your Soul". While the album has been released after his death, the song and the album are dedicated to him.

Death
On May 31, 2018, it was reported that Santolla had suffered a heart attack and fallen into a coma. He was taken off life support and died on June 6, 2018; he was 51 years old.

Discography

With Eyewitness 
 Eyewitness (1995)
 Messiah Complex (1996)

With Millenium 
 Millenium (1997)
 Angelfire (1999)
 Hourglass (2000)
 The Best of... and More – Compilation (2004)
 Jericho (2004)

With Iced Earth 
 The Glorious Burden (2004)

With Deicide 
 The Stench of Redemption (2006)
 Till Death Do Us Part (2008)
 To Hell with God (2011)

With Obituary 
 Xecutioner's Return (2007)
 Left to Die (EP) (2008)
 Darkest Day (2009) 

  Tardy Brother’s Bloodline (2009)

With Gary Hughes 
 Precious Ones (1998)

Order ov Riven Cathedrals 
 Göbekli Tepe - track 5 - From Neptune Towards Assyria (2018)

Solo albums 
 Shaolin Monks in the Temple of Metal (2002)
 Requiem for Hope (2007)

References

External links 
  at official Santolla Facebook
  at "Remembering" Santolla Facebook
 Interview with Ralph Santolla, Fourteen G, 2005-10-03

1966 births
2018 deaths
American heavy metal guitarists
American people of Italian descent
American Roman Catholics
Iced Earth members
Lead guitarists
Death metal musicians
American male guitarists
Obituary (band) members
Deicide (band) members
Musicians from Tampa, Florida